Maureen de St. Croix (née Crowley; born May 25, 1953) is a Canadian middle- and long-distance runner and former sprinter.

At the 1974 British Commonwealth Games she won bronze in the 4 × 400 metres relay and placed sixth in the 800 metres.

She was three times on the Canadian team at the World Cross Country Championships, scoring 43rd 1977 in Düsseldorf, 66th 1979 in Limerick and 108th 1986 in Colombier. Also in 1986, she was the first winner of the Ottawa Race Weekend 10K.

She has continued to run into Masters age groups, in 2003 setting the Masters world record in the 1500 meters at 4:40.92. Her record was displaced in 2009 by former Danish Olympian Gitte Karlshøj running a hand timed 4:40.7, which is essentially the same time as de St. Croix.

She is now a founder and is the head coach of Ocean Athletics, a track club in South Surrey, British Columbia.

External links 

 Profile at the ARS

References

1953 births
Living people
Canadian female middle-distance runners
Canadian female long-distance runners
Canadian female sprinters
Athletes (track and field) at the 1974 British Commonwealth Games
Commonwealth Games medallists in athletics
Commonwealth Games bronze medallists for Canada
Canadian female cross country runners
Medallists at the 1974 British Commonwealth Games